Abres may refer to:
 Abres, Iran, a village in East Azerbaijan Province, Iran
 Abres (Vegadeo), a parish in Asturias, Spain
 San Tirso de Abres, a municipality in Asturias, Spain
 Abris, also known as Abres, an early Christian saint